Martina Hingis and Anna Kournikova defeated Larisa Neiland and Arantxa Sánchez Vicario in the final, 6–4, 6–4 to win the doubles tennis title at the 1999 WTA Tour Championships.

Lindsay Davenport and Natasha Zvereva were the reigning champions, but only Davenport qualified this year partnering Corina Morariu. They were defeated in the semifinals by Neiland and Sánchez Vicario.

Seeds

Draw

Finals

External links
 Draw

Wta Tour Championships - Doubles
Doubles